Crataegus phippsii is a species of hawthorn native to south-central British Columbia, Washington state, and Montana. It forms a shrub or small tree to 7 m in height with leaves that have white hair on the underside, and fruit that ripen through red to purplish black. It appears to have potential as an ornamental plant.

See also 
 List of hawthorn species with black fruit

References

phippsii
Flora of North America